The Sphinx is a natural rock formation in the Bucegi Natural Park which is in the Bucegi Mountains of Romania. It is located at an altitude of  within the Babele complex of rock formations.

The first photo of the Great Bucegi Sphinx was probably taken in about the year 1900. This photograph was taken from a front position, not from a lateral one, as it usually appears in modern pictures. It only acquired its nickname, referring to the Great Sphinx of Giza, in the year 1936. The image of the sphinx appears when the rock, having an 8 m height and a 12 m width, is observed from a certain angle. The megalith has its clearest outline on 21 November, at the time the sun goes down.

In Romanian film
The Sphinx features in the 1967 film The Dacians, in which it is a place of sacrifice to the god Zalmoxis. It also plays a significant role in the 1980 film Burebista, in which it is equated with the eponymous ancient Dacian king and the eternity of Romanian identity.

See also 
 Pareidolia 
 Seven Natural Wonders of Romania

References 

Rock formations of Europe
Tourist attractions in Romania
Tourism in Romania
Mountains of Romania
Tourist attractions in Prahova County
Geography of Prahova County